Cities and towns under republic's jurisdiction
Makhachkala (Махачкала) (capital)
city districts:
Kirovsky (Кировский)
Urban-type settlements under the city district's jurisdiction:
Leninkent (Ленинкент)
Semender (Семендер)
Sulak (Сулак)
Shamkhal (Шамхал)
Leninsky (Ленинский)
Urban-type settlements under the city district's jurisdiction:
Novy Kyakhulay (Новый Кяхулай)
Sovetsky (Советский)
Urban-type settlements under the city district's jurisdiction:
Alburikent (Альбурикент)
Kyakhulay (Кяхулай)
Tarki (Тарки)
Buynaksk (Буйнакск)
Dagestanskiye Ogni (Дагестанские Огни)
Derbent (Дербент)
Izberbash (Избербаш)
Kaspiysk (Каспийск)
Khasavyurt (Хасавюрт)
Kizilyurt (Кизилюрт)
Urban-type settlements under the town's jurisdiction:
Bavtugay (Бавтугай)
Novy Sulak (Новый Сулак)
Kizlyar (Кизляр)
Urban-type settlements under the town's jurisdiction:
Komsomolsky (Комсомольский)
Yuzhno-Sukhokumsk (Южно-Сухокумск)
Districts:
Agulsky (Агульский)
with 6 selsovets under the district's jurisdiction.
Akhtynsky (Ахтынский)
with 4 selsovets under the district's jurisdiction.
Akhvakhsky (Ахвахский)
with 7 selsovets under the district's jurisdiction.
Akushinsky (Акушинский)
with 13 selsovets under the district's jurisdiction.
Babayurtovsky (Бабаюртовский)
with 7 selsovets under the district's jurisdiction.
Botlikhsky (Ботлихский)
with 9 selsovets under the district's jurisdiction.
Buynaksky (Буйнакский)
with 9 selsovets under the district's jurisdiction.
Charodinsky (Чародинский)
with 9 selsovets under the district's jurisdiction.
Dakhadayevsky (Дахадаевский)
Urban-type settlements under the district's jurisdiction:
Kubachi (Кубачи)
with 15 selsovets under the district's jurisdiction.
Derbentsky (Дербентский)
Urban-type settlements under the district's jurisdiction:
Belidzhi (Белиджи)
Mamedkala (Мамедкала)
with 7 selsovets under the district's jurisdiction.
Dokuzparinsky (Докузпаринский)
with 2 selsovets under the district's jurisdiction.
Gergebilsky (Гергебильский)
with 4 selsovets under the district's jurisdiction.
Gumbetovsky (Гумбетовский)
with 6 selsovets under the district's jurisdiction.
Gunibsky (Гунибский)
with 10 selsovets under the district's jurisdiction.
Karabudakhkentsky (Карабудахкентский)
Urban-type settlements under the district's jurisdiction:
Achi-Su (Ачи-Су)
Manas (Манас)
with 2 selsovets under the district's jurisdiction.
Kayakentsky (Каякентский)
with 5 selsovets under the district's jurisdiction.
Kaytagsky (Кайтагский)
with 12 selsovets under the district's jurisdiction.
Kazbekovsky (Казбековский)
Urban-type settlements under the district's jurisdiction:
Dubki (Дубки)
with 2 selsovets under the district's jurisdiction.
Khasavyurtovsky (Хасавюртовский)
with 13 selsovets under the district's jurisdiction.
Khivsky (Хивский)
with 11 selsovets under the district's jurisdiction.
Khunzakhsky (Хунзахский)
with 16 selsovets under the district's jurisdiction.
Kizilyurtovsky (Кизилюртовский)
with 3 selsovets under the district's jurisdiction.
Kizlyarsky (Кизлярский)
with 19 selsovets under the district's jurisdiction.
Kulinsky (Кулинский)
with 2 selsovets under the district's jurisdiction.
Kumtorkalinsky (Кумторкалинский)
Urban-type settlements under the district's jurisdiction:
Tyube (Тюбе)
with 1 selsovet under the district's jurisdiction.
Kurakhsky (Курахский)
with 10 selsovets under the district's jurisdiction.
Laksky (Лакский)
with 16 selsovets under the district's jurisdiction.
Levashinsky (Левашинский)
with 13 selsovets under the district's jurisdiction.
Magaramkentsky (Магарамкентский)
with 8 selsovets under the district's jurisdiction.
Nogaysky (Ногайский)
with 5 selsovets under the district's jurisdiction.
Novolaksky (Новолакский)
with 3 selsovets under the district's jurisdiction.
Rutulsky (Рутульский)
with 11 selsovets under the district's jurisdiction.
Sergokalinsky (Сергокалинский)
with 10 selsovets under the district's jurisdiction.
Shamilsky (Шамильский)
with 10 selsovets under the district's jurisdiction.
Suleyman-Stalsky (Сулейман-Стальский)
with 10 selsovets under the district's jurisdiction.
Tabasaransky (Табасаранский)
with 18 selsovets under the district's jurisdiction.
Tarumovsky (Тарумовский)
with 5 selsovets under the district's jurisdiction.
Tlyaratinsky (Тляратинский)
with 18 selsovets under the district's jurisdiction.
Tsumadinsky (Цумадинский)
with 15 selsovets under the district's jurisdiction.
Tsuntinsky (Цунтинский)
with 11 selsovets under the district's jurisdiction.
Untsukulsky (Унцукульский)
Urban-type settlements under the district's jurisdiction
Shamilkala (Шамилькала)
with 6 selsovets under the district's jurisdiction.

References

External links
 Official Website of Tsumadinsky District, Republic of Dagestan

Geography of Dagestan
Dagestan